Markku Karjalainen (born  in Kajaani) is a Finnish wheelchair curler.

He participated in the 2014 and 2018 Winter Paralympics where Finnish team finished on tenth and eleventh places respectively.

His wife Sari is also a member of the Finland national wheelchair curling team.

Teams

Mixed doubles

References

External links 

Profile at the official website for the 2014 Winter Paralympics
Profile at the official website for the 2018 Winter Paralympics (web archive)
 Video: 

Living people
1966 births
People from Kajaani
Finnish male curlers
Finnish wheelchair curlers
Paralympic wheelchair curlers of Finland
Wheelchair curlers at the 2014 Winter Paralympics
Wheelchair curlers at the 2018 Winter Paralympics
Finnish wheelchair curling champions
Sportspeople from Kainuu
21st-century Finnish people